SK Austria Klagenfurt is an Austrian football club, based in the Carinthian capital Klagenfurt, currently playing in the Austrian Bundesliga.

History 
The emergence of the club marked the end of all efforts to establish an all-Carinthian team to play in the Austrian Football Bundesliga, pushed by the state's government under Jörg Haider. Austria Klagenfurt was already founded in 2007 ahead of the formation of the SK Austria Kärnten football club, but began playing not before SK Austria was dissolved in 2010 and it had merged with SC St. Stefan. SK Austria Klagenfurt plays its home matches at the Hypo Group Arena. The club adopts the tradition of the former SK Austria Klagenfurt founded in 1920, renamed FC Kärnten in 1999, which was dissolved in 2009.

Honours

Domestic

League
Austrian Regionalliga Central:
Winners (1): 2014–15

Players

First team squad

Out on loan

Staff

Head coach history

  Walter Schoppitsch (2010–2011)
  Rudolf Perz (2011)
  Dietmar Thuller (2011–2012)
  Günther Gorenzel-Simonitsch (2012)
  Bruno Friesenbichler (2012–2013)
  Heimo Vorderegger (2013)
  Jože Prelogar (2013–2014)
  Alexander Suppantschitsch (2014)
  Manfred Bender (2014–2016)
  Gerhard Fellner (2016–2017)
  Franz Polanz (2017–2018)
  Robert Micheu (2018–2020)
  Peter Pacult (2020–)

References

External links 
  

Association football clubs established in 1920
Football clubs in Austria
Sport in Klagenfurt
1920 establishments in Austria
SK Austria Klagenfurt (2007)